What I Do is the sixth studio album by Canadian country music artist George Canyon. The album was released on November 11, 2008 by 604 Records. Its first single, "Just Like You," peaked at number 64 on the Canadian Hot 100.

Track listing

Chart performance

Singles

2008 albums
George Canyon albums
Albums produced by Richard Marx